The 1988–89 Illinois State Redbirds men's basketball team represented Illinois State University during the 1988–89 NCAA Division I men's basketball season. The Redbirds, led by eleventh year head coach Bob Donewald, played their home games at both Horton Field House (finishing December, 1988) and Redbird Arena (starting January, 1989) and were a member of the Missouri Valley Conference.

The Redbirds finished the season 13–17, 6–8 in conference play to finish in a tie for fifth place. They were the number seven seed in the Missouri Valley Conference tournament. They were victorious in a quarterfinal game versus Wichita State University but were defeated in a semifinal game versus Southern Illinois University.

Roster

Schedule

|-
!colspan=9 style=|Exhibition Season

|-
!colspan=9 style=|Regular Season

|-
!colspan=9 style=|PepsiMissouri Valley Conference {MVC} tournament

References

Illinois State Redbirds men's basketball seasons
Illinois State
Illinois State Redbirds men's basketball
Illinois State Redbirds men's basketball